Pilpichaca District is one of sixteen districts of the province Huaytará in Peru.

Geography 
Some of the highest mountains of the district are listed below:

See also
 Challwamayu
 Chuqlluqucha
 Q'araqucha
 Urququcha

References